The Gibson J-160E is one of the first acoustic-electric guitars produced by the Gibson Guitar Corporation.

The J-160E was Gibson's second attempt at creating an acoustic-electric guitar (the first being the small-body CF-100E). The basic concept behind the guitar was to fit a single-pickup into a normal-size dreadnought acoustic guitar. The J-160E used plywood for most of the guitar's body, and was ladder-braced, whereas other acoustic Gibsons were X-braced. The rosewood fingerboard had trapezoid inlays, and the guitar had an adjustable bridge. For amplification, a single-coil pickup (an uncovered P-90 pickup) was installed under the top of the body with the pole screws protruding through the top at the end of the fingerboard, with a volume and a tone knob.

John Lennon and George Harrison frequently used one with The Beatles, both on-stage and in the studio. Gibson produces a standard J-160E and a John Lennon J-160E Peace model, based on the J-160E he used during the Bed-In days of 1969. Epiphone makes an EJ-160E John Lennon replica signature model.

References 

J160E
The Beatles' musical instruments
Products introduced in 1954
1954 in music